The Journal of Experimental Psychopathology is a continuously published open access journal covering psychopathology. It was established in 2010 and is published by SAGE Publications. It was relaunched as an open access journal in 2018, after it was combined with the pre-existing journal Psychopathology Review. The editor-in-chief is Graham Davey (University of Sussex). According to the Journal Citation Reports, the journal has a 2018 impact factor of 0.812, ranking it 108th out of 130 journals in the category "Psychology, Clinical".

References

External links

Psychopathology
Clinical psychology journals
Pathology journals
Open access journals
Publications established in 2010
English-language journals
SAGE Publishing academic journals
Continuous journals